The Nasir al-Mulk Mosque ( Masjed-e Nasir ol-Molk), also known as the Pink Mosque (مسجد صورتی Masjed-e Surati), is a traditional mosque in Shiraz, Iran. It is located near Shāh Chérāgh Mosque. It was built during Qajar dynasty rule of Iran.

The mosque includes extensive coloured glass in its facade, and displays other traditional elements such as the Panj Kāse ("five concaved") design.

History
The mosque was built during the Qajar dynasty, and is still in use under protection by the Endowment Foundation of Nasir al Molk. Construction began in 1876 by the order of Mirza Hassan Ali Nasir-ol-Mulk, one of the lords and aristocrats of Shiraz, the son of Ali Akbar Qavam al-Mulk, the kalantar of Shiraz and was completed in 1888. The designers were Mohammad Hasan-e-Memār, a Persian architect who had also built the noted Eram Garden before the Nasir al-Molk Mosque, Mohammad Hosseini Shirazi, and Mohammad Rezā Kāshi-Sāz-e-Širāzi.

Orsi: Persian  Stained Glass 

Although stained glass is mostly popular in churches nowadays, the earliest discovered was in Syria from the 7th century. We do have evidence of techniques and recipes for obtaining stained glass by the Persian chemist Jabir ibn Hayyan in his book Kitab al-Durra al-maknuna (The Book of the Hidden Pearl) published in the eighth century CE. Orsi windows are windows made of a mixture of wood and colorful glass in the Safavid and the Qajar dynasties.  Orsi differs from stained glass used in many churches and Ottoman mosques which serve as illuminated images rather than a source of light. Light is a major feature in many mosques considering it being a major symbol of God in Islam. This is mentioned in a chapter in Quran:

″Allah is the light of the heavens and the earth″

Gallery

See also
List of mosques in Iran
Architecture of Iran

References

External links

Nasir ol Molk Mosque on Art-Days.com
Nasir ol Molk Mosque on Albert-Videt.eu 
BBC Persian: Nasir ol Molk 

Buildings of the Qajar period
Mosques completed in 1888
19th-century mosques
Mosques in Shiraz
Mosque buildings with domes
1880s establishments in Iran
Burial sites of the Qavam family